Dilip Mondal  is an Indian politician Member of Legislative Assembly From Bishnupur, South 24 Parganas (Vidhan Sabha constituency), South 24 Parganas, West Bengal. He won the election, in 2011 being an All India Trinamool Congress candidate and being the Member of West Bengal Legislative Assembly from Bishnupur, South 24 Parganas (Vidhan Sabha constituency)- AC No-146.

External links
Trinamool Congress
Mamata Banerjee

References

Politics of South 24 Parganas district
Trinamool Congress politicians from West Bengal
Living people
1968 births
West Bengal MLAs 2011–2016
West Bengal MLAs 2016–2021